Antoniów  is a village in the administrative district of Gmina Ciepielów, within Lipsko County, Masovian Voivodeship, in east-central Poland.

Climate 
The climate of Antoniów is warm and temperate. Even in the driest months, they still get a significant amount of rainfall. The average annual temperature is 8.4 °C and he rainfall averages at 612 mm.

References

Villages in Lipsko County